The castra of Desa was a fort in the Roman province of Dacia. Erected and abandoned by the Romans in the 3rd century AD, its ruins are located in Desa (Romania).

See also
List of castra

External links
Roman castra from Romania - Google Maps / Earth

Notes

Roman legionary fortresses in Romania
History of Oltenia
Historic monuments in Dolj County